The body of Rey Rivera was found on May 24, 2006, inside the historic Belvedere Hotel in the Mount Vernon neighborhood of Baltimore, Maryland. Although the event was ruled a probable suicide by the Baltimore Police Department, the circumstances of Rivera's death are mysterious and disputed.

Background 

Rey Omar Rivera was born on June 10, 1973, to Angel and Maria Rivera. At the time of his disappearance, Rivera was a 32-year-old finance writer for The Oxford Club as a video contractor. Rivera and his wife Allison had relocated from California to Baltimore to work for his longtime friend Porter Stansberry as a writer and videographer for Stansberry's investment company, Stansberry & Associates Investment Research, a subsidiary of Agora Publishing. Rivera had stopped working for the company six months prior to his death in May 2006, but according to Stansberry, did freelance work for another subsidiary of Agora Publishing.

Disappearance 

Rivera went missing from his residence on May 16, 2006, after receiving a phone call from the Agora Publishing switchboard, according to a guest staying at the Rivera home at the time. After several days of searching for clues on Rivera's whereabouts, his wife's parents found his car located in a parking lot off of Saint Paul Street in Mount Vernon near his workplace. Rivera's coworkers went to the top of a parking structure near where the car was discovered, and noticed a hole in the roof of the south wing of the Belvedere Hotel. Police soon discovered Rivera's partially decomposed body inside the conference room under the roof's hole.

Investigation 
As police began to analyze the case, numerous aspects seemed odd about Rivera jumping off the main roof of the Belvedere Hotel. Partly due to the hotel's mansard roof, there was a considerable horizontal distance between the hotel tower and the location of the hole in the lower roof. The vertical fall of approximately 177 feet (building height 188 ft = 57 meters) would have taken approximately 3.3 seconds. This suggests if he did come from the roof, and traveled a horizontal distance of 43 feet (13 meters) before impact, he would have had to have a horizontal speed of 10 miles per hour which is between a fast jog and a sprint for an average fit male wearing sports shoes. Rey was wearing flip flops or barefoot and would have had a maximum run up of just over 15 feet or 5 meters (2.5 seconds).

An additional theory is that Rivera may have jumped from a ledge several floors below the roof, but it would have been difficult for Rivera to access the ledge from the privately owned condominiums and offices that had windows onto the ledge.

Rivera's eyeglasses and phone were found relatively intact on the lower roof near the hole. Because circumstances surrounding the incident are unclear, the medical examiner marked Rivera's manner of death as "undetermined".

According to Stansberry's publicist, "There was no gag order or direction given to employees to not speak to the press, law enforcement or any other party." After searching the house for evidence, Allison found a note behind Rivera's computer. The confusing note included the names of prominent figures in Hollywood, movie titles, Freemasonry quotations, and additional ramblings. The Federal Bureau of Investigation analyzed the note and ruled it not to be suicidal in nature. Police would soon step back from their investigation into the case after ruling Rivera's death as a probable suicide.

In 2021, new theories about the case emerged in a new investigation carried out by the forensic expert, Miryam Moya, which invalidates the theory of suicide, focusing on the hit-and-run as a possible cause of death. Her research has been published in the book Rey Rivera, Suicide or Homicide?.

Media 

 Rivera's death was featured in the first episode of the Netflix reboot of Unsolved Mysteries in July 2020.

See also 
 List of solved missing person cases
 List of unsolved deaths

References 
Footnotes

Citations

1973 births
2000s missing person cases
2006 controversies in the United States
2006 deaths
2006 in Maryland
American people of Puerto Rican descent
Conspiracy theories in the United States
Death conspiracy theories
Deaths by person in Maryland
Formerly missing people
May 2006 events in the United States
Missing person cases in Maryland
Unsolved deaths in the United States